Philips Sport Vereniging is a Dutch football club based in Eindhoven. The club was founded in 1913.

This article is about the European matches of PSV. In Europe, PSV won the 1977–78 UEFA Cup and the 1987–88 European Cup. Most recent European success was the semi-final in the 2004–05 UEFA Champions League which PSV lost against Milan on an away goal.

History

Early years
Although not the oldest football club in the Netherlands, PSV has always been a successful club in club competition. Not only did they managed to win the Dutch title 24 times, but also they made fame in Europe. In 1955, PSV was the first Dutch club to participate in the European Cup, the first season in which the UEFA introduced a new club competition. This first season, however, was very unsuccessful for PSV, in which they lost the first leg against Rapid Wien 6–1, with Peter Fransen scoring the first European goal for the club. The same player scored in the return, where PSV won 1–0 against the Viennese club, but it was far not enough to progress to the second round.

In the 1963–64 season PSV participated in the European Cup for the second time, making it to the quarter-finals where they lost to FC Zürich. The biggest success gained PSV in the 1970–71 European Cup Winners' Cup. PSV made it to the semi-finals, but Real Madrid proved to be too strong. Revenge against the Spanish winners would come in 1972 and in 1988, the most successful year for PSV.

UEFA Cup success
PSV participated in the UEFA Cup for the first time in 1971 against East German side Hallescher FC. Again, it was also the first edition of a new European Cup, just like 16 years before. After a draw on homesoil, the East Germans withdrew from the competition after the first leg. The following match against Real Madrid was a repeat of the semi-finals of the 1970–71 European Cup Winners' Cup. PSV lost the first leg 1–3 in Madrid, but in the Netherlands, where the return was played in Den Bosch, PSV won 2–0 and managed to book a place in the third round by winning on the away goals rule. In the quarter-finals, however, Belgian club Lierse proved to be too strong, eliminating PSV.

The first golden era, also mentioned as the silver era, proved to be the 1970s. In the 1977–78 UEFA Cup, PSV won the trophy, the first European trophy for the club. In their first final, they played against French opponents Bastia. In a return on home soil, after a 0–0 draw in the first leg, PSV scored 3–0. The legendary squad with Jan van Beveren, Willy van der Kuijlen, and the brothers René and Willy van de Kerkhof is still remembered by PSV fans.

European Cup success
Ten years after the success of winning the UEFA Cup, PSV achieved another memorable performance. In the Eredivisie, PSV proved to be unbeaten, but in Europe, fans were hoping for success. In the 1987–88 European Cup, manager Guus Hiddink created a team that beat Galatasaray, Rapid Wien and Bordeaux on away goals. In the semi-final, PSV ended up again playing Real Madrid. The first leg in Madrid ended in 1–1 by a goal from Edward Linskens, while in the dazzling return, PSV held the Spanish side to a 0–0 draw, ensuring progression to the final on the away goals rule.

The final was played at the Neckarstadion, Stuttgart, against Portuguese side Benfica. After both sides failed to score in regular and extra time, the match went to penalties. Fortunately, PSV goalkeeper Hans van Breukelen was one of the most talented 'keepers in the Netherlands, stopping the crucial penalty from Benfica's António Veloso. It was one of the most important saves of Van Breukelen as the club claimed the European Cup for the first (and only) time. The squad is still loved by fans and most important players were captain Eric Gerets, Ronald Koeman, Wim Kieft, Gerald Vanenburg, Jan Heintze and Søren Lerby.

Champions League
In 1992, the European Cup was rebranded as the UEFA Champions League. In the inaugural Champions League season of 1992–93, PSV was again the first Dutch club who played in the tournament. They reached the group stage, although this proved to be very unsuccessful with just one point earned from six matches.

From 1997–98 until 2008–09, PSV was one of the few clubs which participated in every group stage edition. Although the results were mixed, PSV reached the second round for the first time in the 2004–05. Before that, the club was unable to qualify for the knock-out phase, ended up in third or fourth place.

2004–05 proved to be the most successful Champions League season to date. PSV, with captain Mark van Bommel, Philip Cocu, Jan Vennegoor of Hesselink, Wilfred Bouma, Swiss midfielder Johann Vogel, Brazilians Heurelho Gomes and Alex, Jefferson Farfán and Koreans Park Ji-sung and Lee Young-pyo, progressed to the semi-finals after defeating Lyon on penalties. In the first leg against Milan, the Italians were deadly efficient and won 2–0. In the return leg in Eindhoven, PSV played one of its best ever matches, taking a 2–0 lead only for Massimo Ambrosini to score a fatal away goal for Milan. A late goal by Philip Cocu was not enough for one of the best teams of PSV in history as Milan progressed on away goals.

Matches

Overall record
Last update: 21 July 2021

Notes
1.  Lost on away goals.
2.  Won on away goals.
3.   Lost after extra time.
4.  Won after extra time.
5.  Lost on penalties.
6.  Won on penalties.
7.  Hallescher FC withdrew from the competition after the first leg.
8.  Match was played in Den Bosch.
9.  PSV lost on a coin toss.

References
General
 
Specific

PSV Eindhoven
Psv Eindhoven